Étienne Bellenger (fl. 1580–84) was a merchant from Rouen, France who, through his trading expeditions, became an important figure in the early exploration of the Maritimes in Canada.

Bellenger appears to have been a general merchant who took sea expeditions for trading purposes. A result of trips to the Atlantic coast would have been fish and furs. Charles, Cardinal de Bourbon, the archbishop of Rouen, became aware of Bellenger's previous travels and sponsored a trip to explore and trade along the coast of Nova Scotia. He was also to establish a small post to be left manned while the ship returned to France. In early 1583, the ship left for the New World and Bellenger explored and traded extensively and recorded his findings.

It is certain that Bellenger's records of his journey were quickly available in Europe as the English writer, Richard Hakluyt, soon made contact with him. The information of the trip was readily shared with Hakluyt and recorded in detail.

Because of the involvement of Hakluyt, the interest and knowledge of this part of the America's was widely circulated making Étienne Bellenger's contribution to exploration in Nova Scotia even more important.

References 
 Biography at the Dictionary of Canadian Biography Online
 University of Toronto journals - The Voyage of Étienne Bellenger to the Maritimes in 1583

Canadian explorers
French emigrants to pre-Confederation Nova Scotia
Year of death unknown
Year of birth unknown